The Brit Award for Soundtrack/Cast Recording is an award given by the British Phonographic Industry (BPI), an organisation which represents record companies and artists in the United Kingdom.

Criteria
The accolade is presented at the Brit Awards, an annual celebration of British and international music. The winners and nominees are determined by the Brit Awards voting academy with over one-thousand members, which comprise record labels, publishers, managers, agents, media, and previous winners and nominees.

History
The award was first presented in 1985 as Soundtrack/Cast Recording. 
The accolade was not handed out at the 1986 ceremony and has been defunct as of 2001.

References

Brit Awards
Film music awards
Awards established in 1985
Awards disestablished in 2001
1985 establishments in the United Kingdom
2001 disestablishments in the United Kingdom